Commercial Advancement Training Scheme (CATS) is a dual education system adopted from the German Dual System and introduced in Namibia in 2005, and South Africa in 1985. It combines apprenticeships in a company and technical education at a University in one course. It is accepted and recognized by the European Union through the German Chamber of Commerce and Industry. The programme is also accredited by the South African Qualifications Authority (SAQA) evaluation level 5 /NQF level 5.

Namibia
Introduced in 2005 in Namibia, classes are offered by the Centre for Enterprise Development (CED) at the Polytechnic of Namibia and practical training is provided by partner companies such as Manica, Namport, Agra, TransNamib, Wesbank Transport, Cymot and others.

South Africa
The system was introduced in South Africa in 1985, thereafter graduating more than 1,600 students in the two countries, with the contribution of 360 companies and institutions.

Advantages of dual education
The student works as an employee of the company from the beginning and receives tasks according to his growing abilities. Companies who employ the student after his education, the company gets a well-trained employee. The student develops both hard and soft skills. The student develops under real conditions, getting an earlier look at what the work entails, earning money in the process.

References

External links
 Catsnamibia.org
 Suedafrika.ahk.de

Education in Namibia
Education in South Africa
Education in Germany
Apprenticeship